The 2013 NCAA Division I men's ice hockey tournament was the national championship tournament for men's college ice hockey in the United States in 2013. The tournament involved 16 teams in single-elimination play to determine the national champion at the Division I level of the National Collegiate Athletic Association (NCAA), the highest level of competition in college hockey. The tournament's Frozen Four – the semifinals and finals – was hosted by Robert Morris University at the Consol Energy Center in Pittsburgh. Robert Morris' bid to host was co-sponsored by VisitPittsburgh and the Pittsburgh Penguins.

Yale defeated Quinnipiac 4–0 in the championship game to win the program's first NCAA title.

Tournament procedure

The tournament consists of four groups of four teams in regional brackets.  The four regionals are officially named after their geographic areas.  The following were the sites for the 2013 regionals:
March 29 and 30
Northeast Regional, Verizon Wireless Arena – Manchester, New Hampshire (Host: University of New Hampshire)
West Regional, Van Andel Arena – Grand Rapids, Michigan (Host: University of Michigan)
March 30 and 31
East Regional, Dunkin' Donuts Center – Providence, Rhode Island (Host: Brown University)
Midwest Regional, Huntington Center – Toledo, Ohio (Host: Bowling Green State University)

The winner of each regional will advance to the Frozen Four:
April 11 and 13
Consol Energy Center – Pittsburgh, Pennsylvania (Host: Robert Morris University)

Qualifying teams
The at-large bids and seeding for each team in the tournament were announced on March 24. The Western Collegiate Hockey Association (WCHA) had six teams receive a berth in the tournament, ECAC Hockey and Hockey East each had three teams receive a berth, and the Central Collegiate Hockey Association (CCHA) and Atlantic Hockey each had two teams receive a berth.

Number in parentheses denotes overall seed in the tournament.

Regionals

East Regional – Providence, Rhode Island

Note: * denotes overtime period(s)
All times are local (UTC−4).

Regional semifinals

Regional final

West Regional – Grand Rapids, Michigan

Note: * denotes overtime period(s)
All times are local (UTC−4).

Regional semifinals

Regional final

Northeast Regional – Manchester, New Hampshire

Note: * denotes overtime period(s)
All times are local (UTC−4).

Regional semifinals

Regional final

Midwest Regional – Toledo, Ohio

Note: * denotes overtime period(s)
All times are local (UTC−4).

Regional semifinals

Regional final

Frozen Four – Pittsburgh

The Frozen Four featured four teams that were seeking their first championship.  This was only the second time this had happened since the first NCAA championship tournament in 1948, the other time being in 1958.  Additionally, of the four Frozen Four participants in 2013, only Yale had previously reached the tournament semifinals, having finished third in the 1952 tournament.  Yale's championship was the first for a team from ECAC Hockey since 1989.  The championship game between Yale and Quinnipiac was the first time the championship game was contested between two ECAC Hockey teams since 1978.

Note: * denotes overtime period(s)
All times are local (UTC−4).

National semifinals

National championship

Record by conference

Media

Television
ESPN had US television rights to all games during the tournament. For the ninth consecutive year ESPN aired every game, beginning with the regionals, on ESPN, ESPN2, and ESPNU, and ESPN3. They also streamed them online via WatchESPN.

Broadcast Assignments
Regionals
Northeast Regional: Clay Matvick & Jim Paradise – Manchester, New Hampshire
West Regional: Joe Davis & Sean Ritchlin – Grand Rapids, Michigan
East Regional: John Buccigross & Barry Melrose – Providence, Rhode Island
Midwest Regional: Ben Holden & Darren Eliot – Toledo, Ohio

Frozen Four & Championship
John Buccigross, Barry Melrose, & Clay Matvick – Pittsburgh, Pennsylvania

Radio
Dial Global Sports used exclusive radio rights to air both the semifinals and the championship, AKA the "Frozen Four."
Sean Grande & Cap Raeder

All-Tournament Team

Frozen Four
G: Jeff Malcolm (Yale)
D: Zach Davies (Quinnipiac)
D: Gus Young (Yale)
F: Clinton Bourbonais (Yale)
F: Andrew Miller* (Yale)
F: Jordan Samuels-Thomas (Quinnipiac)
* Most Outstanding Player(s)

References

Tournament
NCAA Division I men's ice hockey tournament
NCAA Division I Men's Ice Hockey Tournament
NCAA Division I Men's Ice Hockey Tournament
NCAA Division I Men's Ice Hockey Tournament
NCAA Division I Men's Ice Hockey Tournament
NCAA Division I Men's Ice Hockey Tournament
NCAA Division I Men's Ice Hockey Tournament
NCAA Division I Men's Ice Hockey Tournament
2010s in Pittsburgh
History of Grand Rapids, Michigan
History of Providence, Rhode Island
History of Toledo, Ohio
Ice hockey competitions in Michigan
Ice hockey competitions in New Hampshire
Ice hockey competitions in Ohio
Ice hockey competitions in Pittsburgh
Ice hockey competitions in Rhode Island
Sports in Grand Rapids, Michigan
Sports in Manchester, New Hampshire
Sports in Providence, Rhode Island
Sports in Toledo, Ohio